Bradley Lord (August 22, 1939 – February 15, 1961) was an American figure skater who competed in men's singles.  He finished fourth at the 1960 United States Figure Skating Championships and then placed sixth at that year's World Figure Skating Championships after the top three U.S. skaters skipped the event.  The following year, he won the gold medal at the 1961 United States Figure Skating Championships and placed second at the 1961 North American Figure Skating Championships.

Lord was en route to the World Championships in 1961 when his plane (Sabena Flight 548) crashed near Brussels, Belgium, killing all on board.

Lord trained with coach Montgomery Wilson at the Skating Club of Boston.  
Away from the ice, Lord attended Boston University and wanted to pursue a career in commercial art.

Results

References

 U.S. Figure Skating biography
 Remembering Flight 548: Shattered dreams

American male single skaters
1939 births
1961 deaths
Victims of aviation accidents or incidents in Belgium
Boston University alumni
Victims of aviation accidents or incidents in 1961
20th-century American people